IFLR may refer to:

 Institute for Food Laws and Regulations
 International Financial Law Review